Broadmeadows Secondary College was a co-educational secondary college located in Victoria, Australia.  The college was located in Broadmeadows, a largely working class suburb of Melbourne. The college provided a comprehensive education from years 7 through to 12 offering both VCE and VCAL qualifications at Year 11 and 12 levels.

Broadmeadows Secondary College ceased to exist after a merger with neighbouring Erinbank and Hillcrest Secondary Colleges. The merged schools formed Hume Central Secondary College.

See also
Hume Central Secondary College
 List of schools in Victoria
 Victorian Certificate of Education

References

Public high schools in Victoria (Australia)